Satre is the surname of:

 Ana Raquel Satre (1925–2014), Uruguayan operatic soprano
 Tully Satre (born 1989), American gay rights activist and gay writer
 Karl Magnus Satre (1907–1967), American Olympic Nordic skiing contestant
 Paul Ottar Satre (1908–1984), American Olympic Nordic skiing contestant
 Pierre Satre (1909–1980), French engineer

Satre may also refer to:
 Satre (Etruscan god)

See also 

 Sartre (disambiguation)
 Sater (disambiguation)